A crude oil assay is the chemical evaluation of crude oil feedstocks by petroleum testing laboratories. Each crude oil type has unique molecular and chemical characteristics. No two crude oil types are identical and there are crucial differences in crude oil quality. The results of crude oil assay testing provide extensive detailed hydrocarbon analysis data for refiners, oil traders and producers. Assay data help refineries determine if a crude oil feedstock is compatible for a particular petroleum refinery or if the crude oil could cause yield, quality, production, environmental and other problems.

The assay can be an inspection assay or comprehensive assay. Testing can include crude oil characterization of whole crude oils and the various boiling range fractions produced from physical or simulated distillation by various procedures. Information obtained from the petroleum assay is used for detailed refinery engineering and client marketing purposes. Feedstock assay data are an important tool in the refining process.

See also

 API gravity
 Cetane index
 K factor (crude oil refining)
 Octane rating
 Petroleum coke
 PONA number
 Ramsbottom carbon residue
 Reid vapor pressure
 Saturate, aromatic, resin and asphaltene (aka SARA)
 True vapor pressure

References

External links 
 Energy Institute Crude Oil Data
 US Dept. of Energy Assay Manual PDF

Oil refining